The 2006 Bulgarian Cup Final was the 66th final of the Bulgarian Cup. The match took place on 24 May 2006 at Vasil Levski National Stadium in Sofia. The match was contested by CSKA Sofia, who beat Naftex Burgas 4–1 in their semi-final, and Cherno More Varna who beat Volov Shumen 2–1 after extra time. CSKA won the final 3–1.

Match

Details

See also
2005–06 A Group

References

Bulgarian Cup finals
Cup Final
PFC CSKA Sofia matches
PFC Cherno More Varna matches